Zenaspididae is an extinct family of jawless fish in the order Zenaspida.

References

External links 

 

Osteostraci
Prehistoric jawless fish families